Leicester Citybus, trading as First Leicester, is a bus operator providing services in Leicester. FirstGroup own 94% of the company with Trentbarton owning the other 6%.

History

In December 1874 the Leicester Tramways Company commenced operating. In July 1901 it was taken over by Leicester Corporation Transport with 39 tramcars and 30 horse-drawn buses and began to be electrified. In July 1924 the first motor buses entered service gradually replacing the trams with the last running in November 1949.

In 1972 Leicester Corporation Transit began operating services in partnership with Midland Red to South Wigston and Wigston Magna and in 1976 to Oadby. In August 1979 the business of Gibson Brothers, Barlestone was purchased which included two services from Market Bosworth to Leicester, one via Barlestone the other via Peckleton.

In 1983 Leicester Corporation Transport was rebranded as Leicester CityBus. To comply with the Transport Act 1985, in 1986 the assets of Leicester CityBus were transferred to a separate legal entity.

In November 1993 Leicester City Council sold its 94% shareholding in Leicester CityBus to GRT Group. After GRT Group merged with Badgerline to form FirstBus in April 1995, the operation was rebranded as First Leicester. FirstGroup own 94% of the shares, with Wellglade Group's Trentbarton the remaining 6%.

Fleet
As of May 2022 the fleet is made up of around 90 buses, mostly consisting of Wright StreetLites and Wright StreetDecks new to Leicester between late 2015 and early 2016. The fleet also consists of a number of Volvo B7RLE bodied Wright Eclipses which are branded for services 18 and 88/88A/88E alongside a mixture of Alexander Dennis Enviro400s and Wright StreetDecks which are branded as FrequentFourteens.

During 2021 Leicester City Council successfully applied for £19 million of funding from the Government's ZEBRA scheme. Infrastructure work at First Leicester's Abbey Lane depot to support 68 Wright GB Kite Electroliner battery electric buses got underway in December 2022, with the electric single-deck buses set to be introduced during early 2023.

Liveries

Leicester City Transport buses were painted in crimson relieved by cream, this was reversed in the 1960s. When rebranded Leicester CityBus, a red, white and grey livery was introduced.

Upon the takeover in November 1993 by GRT Group, the fleet began to wear a version of the GRT corporate livery, with the base and relief colours associated with Leicester City municipal buses, but in the corporate GRT arrangement, with Leicester CityBus fleetnames and a spire motif. This was replaced by FirstGroup corporate livery.

During 2015/2016 First Midlands the parent group of First Leicester introduced a fuchsia fronted version of the latest corporate livery across their fleet. Some of the buses feature route branding, and advertisements for fares & tickets.. others remain plain.

During 2019 service 18 received 4 newer buses in a purple livery branded as 'theBraunstoneBus' with services 88/88A/88E branded as 'Saffron' referring to Saffron Lane which they serve in a yellow and crimson livery.
They later launched a “Frequent Fourteens” identity, consisting of Orange Double deckers for use on the 14&14a services.

Services
Most services are operated from Haymarket Bus Station.

Services operate from the City Centre to Glenfield, New Parks, Braunstone Frith & Kirby Frith, Glenfield Hospital, Braunstone, Eyres Monsell, Saffron Lane, Leicester Royal Infirmary, Evington, Leicester General Hospital, Goodwood, Netherhall, Thurnby Lodge, Thurmaston, Rushey Mead, Mowmacre Hill, Beaumont Shopping Centre, Beaumont Leys, Anstey, Highfields and Birstall.

Depot
In 2007 a new depot was opened on Abbey Lane which is also the headquarters of First Midlands, replacing the former depot on Abbey Park Road which was once home to Leicester's tram network, where a fire in August 1999 destroyed three vehicles and parts of the former tram sheds.

See also
List of bus operators of the United Kingdom

References

External links

Company website

FirstGroup bus operators in England
Transport in Leicestershire
Bus operators in Leicestershire